Standing Room Only is the first live album by the band The Motels, recorded live on June 9, 2006, at The Coach House, San Juan Capistrano.

Track listing
All songs written by Martha Davis, except where noted.
"So L.A." – 4:41
"Closets and Bullets" – 3:44
"Suddenly Last Summer" – 4:22
"Counting" – 4:53
"Celia" – 3:10
"Shame" – 3:58
"Danger" (Davis, Tim McGovern) – 3:26
"Mission of Mercy" – 3:23
"Only the Lonely" – 3:29
"Take the L" (Davis, Marty Jourard, John Carter) – 3:51

Personnel
Credits are taken from the CD's liner notes.

The Motels
Martha Davis – vocals
Mick Taras – lead guitars
Clint Walsh – guitars
Greg Nobles – bass guitar
Scott Martin – saxophone
Tom Brayton – drums
Nic Johns – noises, sounds, and piano

Production
Credits are taken from the CD's liner notes.
Produced by Martha Davis, David Paglia
Recorded by Mark Linnet
Mixing engineered by Jeff Stuart Saltzman
Art direction and design by Lisa Sparagano

References

2007 live albums
The Motels albums